The men's doubles badminton event at the 2018 Commonwealth Games was held from 10 to 15 April 2018 at the Carrara Sports and Leisure Centre on the Gold Coast, Australia. The defending gold medalists were Goh V Shem and Tan Wee Kiong of Malaysia.

The athletes were drawn into straight knockout stage. The draw for the competition was conducted on 2 April 2018.

Seeds
The seeds for the tournament were:

  (bronze medalists)
  (silver medalists)

  (gold medalists)
  (quarter-finals)

Results

Finals

Top half

Section 1

Section 2

Bottom half

Section 3

Section 4

References

Men's doubles